Greece, the birthplace of the Ancient Olympic Games that hosted the inaugural 1896 Summer Olympics, did not compete in the Summer Paralympics until 1976 and in the Winter Paralympics until 2002, but since then the Greeks have taken part in every edition of both events. Although the Greek delegation traditionally enters first during the parade of nations at the opening ceremony of the Olympic Games, this tradition does not apply to the Paralympics, where Greece enters within alphabetical order. The National Paralympic Committee for Greece is the Hellenic Paralympic Committee.

Greek competitors have won 104 medals, 20 of which gold, and Greece currently ranks 44th in the all-time Summer Paralympic Games. Greece's participation in the Winter Paralympics has been essentially symbolic; it was represented by a single athlete in 2002 and 2006, and by two competitors in 2010. The nation hosted the 2004 Summer Paralympics in Athens. The best Paralympic performance of Greece was in the 2008 Summer Games, when the nation finished 20th with 5 gold medals and 24 in total. The top medal-producing sports have been swimming and athletics, while boccia, powerlifting and wheelchair fencing are the other sports that Greece has also won medals in.

Medal Tables

Medals by Summer Games

Medals by sport

Medalists

Top medalists
The table below lists the top Paralympic medalists for Greece, sorted by gold, silver and then bronze medals.

See also
 Greece at the Olympics

References